Henri Jules Valton (11 May 1867 – 6 August 1941) was a French sailor who competed in the 1900 Summer Olympics in Meulan, France. With Jacques Baudrier as helmsman and fellow crewmember William Martin, Félix Marcotte and Jean Le Bret Valton took the 2nd place in first race of the .5 to 1 ton and finished 3rd in the second race.

Further reading

References

External links

1867 births
1941 deaths
French male sailors (sport)
Sailors at the 1900 Summer Olympics – .5 to 1 ton
Olympic sailors of France
Medalists at the 1900 Summer Olympics
Olympic silver medalists for France
Olympic bronze medalists for France
Olympic medalists in sailing
Sailors at the 1900 Summer Olympics – 10 to 20 ton
Sailors at the 1900 Summer Olympics – Open class